Colletotrichum nicholsonii is a falcate-spored graminicolous plant pathogenic fungi species, first isolated from warm-season grasses.

References

Further reading
Crouch, Jo Anne, et al. "Anthracnose disease of switchgrass caused by the novel fungal species Colletotrichum navitas." Mycological research 113.12 (2009): 1411–1421.
Jelesko, John G., and Matthew Kasson. "Compositions and methods comprising colletotrichum for controlling plant species." U.S. Patent Application 14/528,188.
Crouch, J. A., and L. A. Beirn. "Anthracnose of cereals and grasses." Fungal Diversity 39 (2009): 19.

External links

MycoBank

nicholsonii
Fungi described in 2009